This is a list of melodic death metal bands. Melodic death metal is a heavy metal music style that combines elements from the new wave of British heavy metal (NWOBHM) with elements of death metal. The term "Gothenburg metal" is often used to describe bands associated with or stylistically similar to the melodic death metal scene that originated around Gothenburg, Sweden.

See also 
Melodic death metal
List of heavy metal bands
Heavy metal subgenres

References 

 
Lists of death metal bands